This is a list of Finnish football transfers in the winter transfer window 2014–15  by club. Only transfers of the Veikkausliiga and Ykkönen are included.

Veikkausliiga
Note: Flags indicate national team as has been defined under FIFA eligibility rules. Players may hold more than one non-FIFA nationality.

FC Ilves

In:

Out:

FC Inter

In:

Out:

FC Lahti

In:

Out:

FF Jaro

In:

Out:

HIFK

In:

Out:

HJK

In:

Out:

IFK Mariehamn

In:

Out:

KTP

In:

Out:

KuPS

In:

Out:

RoPS

In:

Out:

SJK

In:

Out:

VPS

In:

Out:

Ykkönen 
Note: Flags indicate national team as has been defined under FIFA eligibility rules. Players may hold more than one non-FIFA nationality.

AC Oulu

In:

Out:

Ekenäs IF

In:

Out:

FC Haka

In:

Out:

FC Jazz

In:

Out:

JJK

In:

Out:

MP

In:

Out:

PK-35

In:

Out:

PS Kemi

In:

Out:

TPS

In:

Out:

Vasa IFK 

In:

Out:

See also
2015 Veikkausliiga
2015 Ykkönen

References 

Finnish
Transfers
2014–15